General elections were held in Fiji between 18 and 25 February 1994. This election, the second since Fiji had become a republic following two military coups in 1987, was brought about by splits within the ruling Soqosoqo ni Vakavulewa ni Taukei (SVT) and by the withdrawal of the support of the Fiji Labour Party, which claimed that Prime Minister Sitiveni Rabuka had reneged on a deal to review Fiji's electoral system, which was heavily weighted in favour of ethnic Fijians, despite their being nearly equal in number to Indo-Fijians.

The elections produced little change among the 38 seats in the House of Representatives that were reserved for ethnic Fijians and Rotuman Islanders.  The SVT won 33 seats (a gain of three), and the Fijian Association Party of former Finance Minister Josefata Kamikamica won five (one down).  The Fijian Nationalist Party of Sakeasi Butadroka, which advocated the forced repatriation of all Fijians of Indian descent, lost the three seats that it had won in the previous election.  The five "general electorates," reserved for Fiji's European, Chinese, and other minorities, showed similarly little change, with the General Voters Party winning four seats and the All Nationals Congress, one.  There was a very significant change in the composition of the 27 Indo-Fijian seats, however.  The Fiji Labour Party lost 6 of its 13 seats, with the National Federation Party winning the remaining 20.  The NFP leader, Jai Ram Reddy, enjoyed a personal rapport with Rabuka; although they did not enter into a formal coalition, their negotiations led to a substantial overhaul of the Fijian Constitution which paved the way for the historic election of 1999, which brought Fiji's first Indo-Fijian Prime Minister, Mahendra Chaudhry, to power.

Following the 1994 election, Rabuka formed a coalition with the General Voters Party and remained Prime Minister.

Results

See also
List of members of the Parliament of Fiji (1994–1999)

References

Elections in Fiji
Fiji
General
Fiji